Robert O'Brien (16 July 1869 – 2 October 1922) was an Australian cricketer. He played in four first-class matches for Queensland between 1892 and 1897.

See also
 List of Queensland first-class cricketers

References

External links
 

1869 births
1922 deaths
Australian cricketers
Queensland cricketers
Cricketers from Sydney